Widecombe Fair is a 1928 British silent comedy drama film directed by Norman Walker and starring William Freshman, Marguerite Allan, Moore Marriott and Judd Green. The screenplay concerns a farmer who is able to save his farm when he digs up buried treasure. The film's plot was adapted from a 1913 novel by Eden Phillpotts, loosely based on the popular folk song "Widecombe Fair".

Cast
 William Freshman as The Lover 
 Marguerite Allan as The Daughter 
 Wyndham Standing as The Squire 
 Violet Hopson as The Widow 
 Moore Marriott as Uncle Tom Cobleigh 
 George Cooper as The Farmer 
 Aubrey Fitzgerald as The Bailiff 
 Eva Llewellyn as The Wife 
 Judd Green as The Landlord

Bibliography
 Low, Rachael. History of the British Film, 1918-1929. George Allen & Unwin, 1971.
 Wood, Linda. British Films 1927-1939. BFI, 1986.

References

External links

Widecombe Fair on the BFI Player (UK only)

1928 films
1920s English-language films
British comedy-drama films
British silent feature films
Films shot at British International Pictures Studios
Films directed by Norman Walker
Films set in England
Films set in Devon
Films based on British novels
British black-and-white films
1928 comedy-drama films
1920s British films
Silent comedy-drama films